Sasquatch Mountain Resort is a small ski resort located in the Douglas Ranges near Chehalis, British Columbia, Canada, between the towns of Mission and Agassiz.

Previously Known as Hemlock Valley Resort the resort closed due to bankruptcy receivership in 2005. In 2006, the resort was purchased by Berezan Hospitality group and reopened in December 2006. Shortly thereafter the resort started negotiations with local First Nations and the province of BC for a substantial expansion that would see the resort become the largest resort facility in the Lower Mainland of BC.

The resort proposal includes ski area expansion to 18 lift-serviced areas, 2 golf courses, a marina on Harrison Lake and associated residential and commercial development. The plan was in the final stages of approval and a formal agreement was expected to be announced in 2014. The resort did not open in the 2014/2015 season, due to a lack of snow.

Average annual snowfall at Hemlock Valley is 30–35 ft. The vertical drop is 335 m (1,100 ft) from a summit elevation of 1,317 m (4,320 ft) to a base elevation of 980 m (3,220 ft). The area comprises 121 hectares (300 acres) and has 34 runs, the longest of which is 1.4 miles (2.3 km). The area has four lifts - one quad chair, one triple chair, one double chairs and a beginner magic carpet, and features night skiing and 13 kilometres of cross-country skiing trails as well as an 8 lane tubing and tobogganing area with a magic carpet.

History 
Hemlock Valley was first opened for skiing on December 21, 1969, by a company
known then as Hemlock Valley Recreation (HVR).
The facilities were initially very basic, with just a single rope-tow lift
and an older school bus fitted with a wood-burning stove to serve as the ski lodge.
Some 30-40 families visited the ski hill that first season.

Over the 70s a lodge was built and three chair lifts were added, with the third lift
completed in 1978. A resort community of 225 lots was developed.

Due to the recession of the early 80s the resort encountered financial difficulties and ownership was transferred to the provincial government via the British Columbia Development Corporation.
A new company then acquired the ski hill, operating under the name Hemlock Valley
Resorts Inc (HVRI).

In 2004-2005 there was not enough snow for the resort to open.

The resort remained closed for the 2005-2006 season due to being in receivership.

In fall 2006 the resort was purchased by Berezan Group, a company based in Langley, BC.
Hemlock Valley reopened for the 2006-2007 season as Hemlock Resort.

The 2013-2014 season opened late, on January 16, because of lack of snow.

The 2014-2015 ski season was cancelled entirely due to lack of snow.

In 2015, Hemlock Resort's $1.5 billion all-season expansion plan was approved by the BC government.

References

External links
Sasquatch Mountain Resort

Ski areas and resorts in British Columbia
Lower Mainland
Populated places in the Fraser Valley Regional District
Pacific Ranges